The following is a list of Radio Disney Music Award winners and nominees for Best Breakup Song.Taylor Swift is the only artist to win this award twice.

Winners and nominees

2010s

References

Breakup Song
Song awards